The Ministry of Science and Technology is the central government ministry which coordinates science and technology activities in the country. The office is located in Xicheng District, Beijing.
The ministry is responsible for formulating guidelines and related policies for science and technology in China development and promoting basic and special research on science and technology.  The Ministry develop human resources, including introducing foreign intellectual planning and organising international scientific and technological cooperation and talent exchanges and strengthening China's innovation capabilities in the field of international scientific research.

History of ministry
The predecessor of MOST was the National Technical Committee established at the 28th Plenary Session of the State Council in 1956. It merged with the Scientific Planning Commission to form the State Science and Technology Commission in 1958. The commission was abolished in 1970 but was re-established in March 1978. The commission was renamed to the Ministry of Science and Technology of the People's Republic of China at the 9th National People's Congress in 1998.

Restructuring in 2018
The major restructuring was in 2018. The Ministry of Science and Technology was approved for reorganisation at the National People's Congress in Beijing, where 15 ministries were be merged, reorganised, or abolished. The most significant departmental adjustment is the merger of the National Natural Science Foundation of China (NSFC) into the Ministry of Science and Technology. The NSFC is a semi-autonomous research funding agency that provided about $4.7 billion in funding to 120,000 research projects in 2017. The change has raised concerns among university research departments and individual scientists, who are concerned that funding for research unrelated to government priorities may reduce. The Science and Technology Minister Wang Zhigang responded to this concern that ministry will not force scientists to target specific research directions, scientists will conduct research in a free research environment. In addition, The State Administration of Foreign Experts Affairs was also merged into the Ministry of Science and Technology in this reorganisation. The merger of this department reflects that China will invest more in global research cooperation.

List of ministers

Missions of Ministry
 Formulate policies and directions for the development of innovative science and technology, introduce and implement foreign scientific policies.
 Promote the reform of China's innovation system and scientific system, and improve the incentive mechanism for scientific and technological innovation. Optimise the scientific research system, promote the development of scientific research institutes, enhance the innovation capabilities of enterprises, and build a national major scientific decision-making consultation system.
 Responsible for establishing a unified technology management platform for scientific research funding allocation, evaluation, and supervision. Work with relevant departments to build a diversified management system to supervise the central financial science and technology plan.
 Formulate and implement national basic research policies, and organise major national basic research and applied research projects. Build and supervise scientific and technological innovation bases, participate in the formulation of major scientific infrastructure, lead the establishment of State Key Laboratories, and promote scientific research environmental protection and resource sharing.
 Formulate plans for major national science and technology projects and supervise their implementation, coordinate the research and development of key cutting-edge technologies, modern engineering technologies, and innovative technologies, and organise demonstrations of the application of major technologies. Coordinates international mega science programs and engineering.
 Organise the development and industrialisation of innovative technologies, and promote the development of agriculture, rural areas and society through science and technology. Organise and carry out technical development needs analysis in key areas, propose task directions and supervise implementation.
 Lead the construction of the national technology transfer system, formulate relevant policies and measures for the transformation of scientific and technological achievements and promote the combination of learning and scientific research, and supervise the implementation. Guide the development of science and technology service industry, technology market and science and technology organisation.
 Coordinate the construction of regional scientific and technological innovation systems, guide the innovation and development of various regions, rationally distribute scientific and technological resources, and build innovation capabilities, and promote the construction of science and technology parks.

 Responsible for the construction and management of the scientific and technological evaluation system, and coordinate the construction of scientific research integrity. Organise the implementation of the national innovation investigation and scientific and technological reporting system, and guide the national scientific and technological confidentiality work.
 Formulate plans and measures for scientific and technological foreign exchanges and open cooperation in innovation capacity, organise international scientific and technological cooperation and conduct scientific talent exchanges. Guiding relevant departments and localities for foreign scientific and technological cooperation and scientific and technological personnel exchanges.
 Responsible for the introduction of foreign scientific talents. Formulate and organize the implementation of national key plans for the introduction of foreign experts. Establish a mechanism for attracting top foreign scientists, a team and a service mechanism for contacting key foreign experts. Formulate overseas training plans and supervise the implementation of policies.
 Formulate plans and policies for team building of scientific and technological talents with relevant departments, and establish a complete evaluation and incentive mechanism for scientific and technological talents. Promote the construction of high-tech innovative talent teams. Formulate plans and policies for the popularisation and dissemination of science education.
 Responsible for the evaluation of the Highest Science and Technology Award and the Friendship Award.
 Responsible for the management of the National Natural Science Foundation of China, macro-management, overall coordination, supervision and evaluation of NSFC in accordance with the law.
 Responsible for the management of Science and Technology Daily.
 Complete other scientific and technological tasks assigned by the State Council.

Cooperation

The United Nations (UN)
In December 2017, the Ministry of Science and Technology of China and the United Nations Department of Economic and Social Affairs(UN DESA) reached an agreement with the goal of strengthening knowledge sharing, capacity building and cooperation in sustainable development among countries. In addition, Mr. Liu Zhenmin, Deputy Secretary-General of the United Nations Department of Economic and Social Affairs, said that DESA and MOST signed a memorandum of understanding to encourage developing countries to conduct joint research in the field of green technology.

The World Academy of Sciences (TWAS)
In July 2019, TWAS Executive Director Romain Murenzi held talks with Wang Zhigang, Minister of MOST, to discuss issues such as jointly advancing scientific development in the global South. Murenzi said that the cooperative relationship between China and TWAS began 35 years ago at the beginning of TWAS establishment, and proposed to strengthen more scientific exchanges and cooperation with the Ministry of Science and Technology of China in the future.

European Union (EU)
In 2009, the Chinese Ministry of Science and Technology established a scientific cooperation program with the European Commission (CE), with the goal of conducting joint projects in scientific research areas of mutual interest. On December 16, 2015, the Ministry of Science and Technology of China launched a call for proposals. MOST will provide 200 million RMB annually to support the cooperation between China and European partners in various fields. The main supported scientific research fields are food, agriculture, biotechnology, information technology, aerospace, energy, health, etc.

Australian Government

The Australia-China Science and Research Fund (ACSRF)
This fund is jointly managed by the Ministry of Science and Technology of China and the Australian government, and mainly supports strategic scientific and technological cooperation between Australia and China. The priority research fields supported by ACSRF are the fields of food and agriculture, health technology, and renewable energy. ACSRF will also fund the establishment of joint research centers, hold special scientific lectures and conduct exchange programs for young scientists.

Queensland Government
The Queensland government was the first state in Australia to sign a memorandum of understanding with the Chinese Ministry of Science and Technology, originally signed in 2008 and renewed in 2014. It covers cooperation in the fields of renewable energy technology, environment, advanced materials, nanotechnology, agriculture, etc.

The National Research Council Canada
In February 2016, representatives from the National Research Council of Canada and MOST signed a letter of intent to support collaboration and funding in scientific and technological innovation. Vice President of the Industrial Research Assistance Program at the National Research Council of Canada Mr. Bogdan Ciobanu said that this agreement provides channels for Canadian Small and medium-sized enterprises to cooperate, fund, and promote with their Chinese counterparts and explain that this partnership will increase the global presence of Canadian companies.

Innovation Fund Denmark
In 2020, MOST and Innovation Fund Denmark carried out bilateral cooperation on sustainable city development solutions. In this project, Innovation Fund Denmark will allocate 15 million Danish krone, and MOST will allocate 20 million RMB to support four to five joint innovation research projects. The background of this cooperation is that both parties want to contribute to sustainable urban development, and the priority areas for funding are energy storage and smart city.

Supported project

Chronic kidney disease survey
The survey is a nationwide public health survey supported by the Ministry of Science and Technology of China, and a total of 50,500 adults were invited to conduct the survey. The background of this survey is that the prevalence of chronic kidney disease in developing countries is relatively high, but there is no such related survey in China. To specifically analyse the factors related to chronic kidney disease, this survey uses logistic regression. The survey concluded that the estimated prevalence of chronic kidney disease in China is similar to that in developed countries such as the United States and Norway. However, the prevalence of stage 3 and stage 4 chronic kidney disease is lower than the prevalence in the United States and Norway. Researchers speculate that the prevalence of hypertension and diabetes in China has increased rapidly in the past 20 years. Therefore, the prevalence of stage 3 and stage 4 chronic kidney disease will gradually increase in the next decade. The final result shows that chronic kidney disease has become one of the most important public health problems in China, and it needs more attention in rural areas with the poor economy.

Plasma Surface Metallurgy project 
The MOST  has corresponding support in material research in2018.The main research direction of this project is the plasma surface metallurgy technique. The research has developed an alloy material that can withstand the requirements of industrial applications above 800 °C and has oxidation resistance. This alloy material will contribute to China's aerospace industry and automotive industry.

Coal energy development

Since 2005, the Ministry of Science and Technology of China has formulated the main development direction of China's medium and long-term national energy is the new coal chemical industry, to reduce environmental pollution and dependence on imported crude oil.

Before 2005
Most of China's energy was produced by burning coal. This method of coal utilisation would produce a lot of harmful gases, which directly led to the world's top ten polluted cities all in China, and huge economic losses. Since 2005, under the strategy of the Ministry of Science and Technology, the energy consumption and industrial scale of the coal chemical industry have increased year by year. This strategy is expected to reduce China's air pollution and efficient utilisation of coal and other issues.

After 2010

An article published in Renewable & sustainable energy reviews in 2015 pointed out that China's energy consumption and production in 2010 were greater than the early forecasts of the Ministry of Science and Technology of China. China's energy consumption has grown rapidly from 6% to 20% of the world's energy consumption in 30 years. In addition, carbon dioxide emissions have risen from 8 percent of the world's total to 24 percent in 30 years.
These facts prove that the new coal chemical industry promoted by the Ministry of Science and Technology of China in 2005 has not freed China from problems such as excessive energy consumption and air pollution. The main reason for the wrong direction of the national energy development strategy is that the Ministry of Science and Technology of China incorrectly estimated the modern per capita living energy consumption. In the context of high tech development, China's per capita living energy consumption is on average 50% higher than a decade ago.

Future
It is speculated that the future energy development strategy formulated by the Ministry of Science and Technology of China will consist of three parts, namely improving energy efficiency, using more non-coal energy, and promoting national energy conservation. As for the specific energy development strategy, the Ministry of Science and Technology of China has not officially issued a statement.

See also
Hydrogen energy vision and technology roadmap
Ministries of China
Science and Technology Daily

References

External links 
 

Science and technology
Science and technology in the People's Republic of China
China
China, Science and technology
1998 establishments in China